Zarya is a rural locality (a village) in Arkh-Latyshsky Selsoviet, Arkhangelsky District, Bashkortostan, Russia. The population was 294 as of 2010. There are 10 streets.

Geography 
Zarya is located 17 km south of Arkhangelskoye (the district's administrative centre) by road. Maxim Gorky is the nearest rural locality.

References 

Rural localities in Arkhangelsky District